Karanayevo (Qaranay) is a rural locality (a village) in Duvan-Mechetlinsky Selsoviet, Mechetlinsky District, Bashkortostan, Russia. The population was 170 as of 2010. There are 4 streets.

Geography 
Karanayevo is located 41 km south of Bolsheustyikinskoye (the district's administrative centre) by road. Duvan-Mechetlino is the nearest rural locality.

References 

Rural localities in Mechetlinsky District